Frank Robert Henry White (14 April 1911 – 1985) was an English professional footballer who played as a winger. He played nearly 150 First Division games for Birmingham, and also played in the Football League for Preston North End.

White was born in Piccadilly, Warwickshire. He was a prolific goalscorer in junior football before signing for Birmingham on the recommendation of Harry Hibbs. He was pacy with good dribbling and shooting skills, and performed better once moved from the left side, where he had initially been employed as the replacement for Ernie Curtis, to his preferred position of outside-right. His last two seasons at Birmingham were disrupted by injury. Over his career at Birmingham he scored at a rate of a goal every three games.

In December 1938 he moved to Preston North End; he scored ten league goals in the half-season remaining but then the Second World War put paid to his professional career. He made guest appearances for several clubs during the war and afterwards played for Redditch United. He later coached his former club Tamworth. He died in 1985 aged 74.

References

1911 births
1985 deaths
Sportspeople from Tamworth, Staffordshire
English footballers
Association football wingers
Tamworth F.C. players
Birmingham City F.C. players
Preston North End F.C. players
Redditch United F.C. players
Date of death missing
Place of death missing